The 1879 South Australian Football Association season was the 3rd season of the top-level Australian rules football competition in South Australia.

The  Football Club went on to record its 2nd consecutive premiership, going through the season undefeated. The Kensington Football Club received its second consecutive wooden spoon, failing to win a game, and extending its winless streak to 27. Several disputes between South Adelaide and the other clubs arose during the season.

Pre season

Premiership season

Round 1

Round 2

Round 3

Round 4

Round 5

Round 6

Round 7

Round 8

Round 9

Round 10

Round 11

Round 12

Round 13

Round 14

Round 15

Ladder

Notes: 

 Following disputes between South Adelaide and other clubs, Adelaide (twice), Norwood, Port Adelaide, and Victorian (once each) all refused to play them: these five cancelled matches are not included in the above ladder.
 Kensington only played Norwood once, with their only scheduled match against Port Adelaide being forfeited due to a lack of players.
 Port Adelaide were ranked above South Adelaide on match ratio (only match was drawn), while Victorian were ranked above South Park (1-0-1) and South Park were ranked above Adelaide (1-0-1) on head-to-head record.

Intercolonial matches
During 1879, a team representing the South Australian Football Association) toured Victoria, and played two intercolonial matches against an Association representative team; the first on a public holiday Tuesday, and the other on the following Saturday. The games were the first ever intercolonial matches between colony representative teams.

References

SANFL
South Australian National Football League seasons